Asfak (also Romanized as Aşfāk and Eşfāk; also known as Asopak and Aspāk) is a village in Ali Jamal Rural District, in the Central District of Boshruyeh County, South Khorasan Province, Iran. At the 2006 census, its population was 110, in 35 families.

References 

Populated places in Boshruyeh County